Fisher Wright may refer to:
Fisher-Wright population, a term in population genetics
Blanche Fisher Wright (1887-1971)?, American children's book illustrator